Mehmet Salih Uzun (b. 1970 Kocaeli, Turkey) is a Turkish politician and former and final leader of the Motherland Party (Anavatan Partisi, ANAP).

Biography
Uzun was born in the northwestern Anatolian town of Gölcük in Kocaeli Province. He graduated from the Ankara University's Faculty of Political Sciences. After receiving his Master's degree from the same university, Uzun completed his PhD at Selçuk University.

Salih Uzun was elected 7th president of ANAP at the party congress on October 26, 2008. He served as leader until October 2009 when Motherland Party was merged to Democratic Party. He is succeeded by Hüsamettin Cindoruk, who is the leader of Democratic Party. 

He is married and has a child.

External links
Motherland party official website 

1970 births
People from İzmit
Ankara University Faculty of Political Sciences alumni
Leaders of political parties in Turkey
Living people
Motherland Party (Turkey) politicians
Democrat Party (Turkey, current) politicians